The International Journal of Aerospace Psychology (formerly The International Journal of Aviation Psychology until 2017) is a quarterly peer-reviewed academic journal covering research on the "development and management of safe, effective aviation systems from the standpoint of the human operators." It draws on aspects of the academic disciplines of engineering and computer science, psychology, education, and physiology. It was established in 1991 and is published by Taylor and Francis on behalf of the Association of Aviation Psychology. The editor-in-chief is Dennis B. Beringer.

Abstracting and indexing
The journal is abstracted and indexed in:

According to the Journal Citation Reports, the journal has a 2012 impact factor of 0.167, ranking it 71st out of 72 journals in the category "Applied Psychology".

Notable articles 
According to the Web of Science, the journal's most cited paper is:
  ( cited over 200 times)

References

External links
 
 Association of Aviation Psychology

Quarterly journals
Publications established in 1991
English-language journals
Applied psychology journals
Taylor & Francis academic journals